Cem Kızıltuğ (born 1974, Istanbul) is a Turkish cartoonist and illustrator. He is a cartoonist and illustrator for Zaman and also illustrates children's books.

Background
Kızıltuğ graduated from Marmara University, Faculty of Fine Arts in 1997. Cem Kızıltuğ is married to graphic designer Ravza Kızıltuğ.

Career
He has worked as an illustrator for national newspaper Zaman since right after his graduation. The cartoons he drew for Zaman on weekends were published in the album C’empati in 2003. Kızıltuğ developed a comic strip called "Mr. Diplomat" for Zaman's English-language subsidiary, Today's Zaman, in 2007.

Kızıltuğ illustrated children's books for the internationally acclaimed Museum of Sakip Sabanci from 2005 to 2008. His work, “Cats and Words”, an album of poetry and illustration,  was published in 2006. Kızıltuğ also illustrated children's books for publishers in Turkey such as Yapi Kredi Publishing and Timas Publishing Group.

Kızıltuğ opened art exhibitions in İzmir Efes Celcus Library in 1998, 1999, 2000, and 2002. He is currently involved in an extensive project with Turkish Airlines.

Awards
 Turkish Writers’ Association gave Cem Kızıltuğ the "Cartoonist of the Year" award in 2005. 
 He gained 10 "Award of Excellence" and a silver award for his illustration in the competition, Society for News Design in 2006, 2007, 2008, 2009, and 2010.

References

External links

www.cemkiziltug.com

Living people
1974 births
Artists from Istanbul
Marmara University alumni
Turkish cartoonists
Turkish comics artists
Turkish illustrators
Turkish children's book illustrators
Zaman (newspaper) people